HESA may refer to:
 Hisyah, an alternative name for a town in Syria
 Iran Aircraft Manufacturing Industrial Company, an Iranian aircraft manufacturer
 Higher Education South Africa, an association of universities in South Africa
 Higher Education Statistics Agency, a statistics-collection agency in the United Kingdom
 Higher Education Support Act 2003, an Australian Act of Parliament relating to the funding of higher education that came into effect on 1 January 2005
 Harvard Extension Student Association, a student government organization for Harvard Extension School
 Hybrid dry electrode array, sensors to record EEG signals